Sakhi Hassan is a neighborhood in the Karachi Central district of Karachi, Pakistan.

Sakhi Hasan is named as the shrine (mazar) of a pious man Sakhi Hasan is there. There is another mazar of a pious man and famous poet Behzad Lakhnavi & Hakim M.Jamil Arfi Sarkar. This area is particularly known for its politician, Rashid Khan, who hails from this area and is popular for his journalistic contributions. This area is densely populated. Serena Mobile Market and Haron Shopping Mall and many restaurants are located  here. Other famous sites are Dak Khana (Post Office) Karachi Medical and Dental Hospital KMDC, marriage lawns, food outlets and several girls' and boys' colleges and schools including the Albatross Grammar School. Also it has one of the largest government girls of Karachi, Govt Comprehensive Higher Secondary School.

References

External links
 Karachi Website

North Nazimabad Town
Karachi Central District